Transport for Edinburgh is the organisation that oversees public transport in Edinburgh, Scotland, UK. It manages the city's public transport operations in a similar manner to Transport for London, but with many fewer powers. The organisation works to integrate public transport services in Edinburgh operated by Edinburgh Trams, Lothian Buses and First Scotland East. It focused solely on buses and trams during its first twelve months and later included cycles. The formation of the organisation was announced on 15 August 2013, by Edinburgh transport convener and former Lord Provost of Edinburgh Lesley Hinds.

The body holds The City of Edinburgh Council's 91% stake in Lothian Buses, and its 100% stake in Edinburgh Trams. It has been reported that Transport for Edinburgh is the tenth largest employer in Edinburgh. The board of directors of the body is chaired by Lesley Hinds. She is joined on the board by Jim McFarlane, Charlene Wallace, Steve Cassidy and city councillors Karen Doran, Claire Miller and Callum Laidlaw. Former non-executive directors have included solicitor Ann Faulds and transport specialist Tony Depledge.

Transport for Edinburgh does not have a separate office, but instead utilises the offices of Lothian Buses. Its logo was revealed on 17 December 2013.

See also
Transport in Edinburgh
Proposals for new tram lines in Edinburgh

References

Transport in Edinburgh
2013 establishments in Scotland
Public transport executives in the United Kingdom